Dragica Kresoja; born 13 August 1986) is a Macedonian handball player. Kresoja is of Serbian origin and received Macedonian citizenship in 2007. Having previously played for the Serbia and Montenegro team at the 2005 Mediterranean Games, she played for the Macedonia women's national handball team at the 2007 World Women's Handball Championship in France, she made her debut for Macedonia in 2008, when her home country hosted the 2008 European Women's Handball Championship.

References

External links 
 Official Site

1986 births
Living people
Macedonian female handball players
Serbian female handball players
Serbian expatriate sportspeople in North Macedonia
Serbs of North Macedonia
Mediterranean Games silver medalists for Serbia
Competitors at the 2005 Mediterranean Games
Mediterranean Games medalists in handball